Skybox may refer to:

 Skybox (band), an American indie pop band
 Skybox (sports), a type of private luxury seating area in sports stadiums
 Skybox (video games), a construct used in 3D graphics to simulate skies
 Skybox Imaging, a satellite operator
 SkyBox International, a trading card company
 SkyBox Labs, video game developer
 Sky box or Digibox, a set-top box provided by Sky UK
 Skybox, a song from Wunna (album)
 SkyBOX, a waterslide by ProSlide Technology